Xavier Cañellas Sánchez (born 16 March 1997) is a Spanish professional racing cyclist, who currently rides for UCI Continental team . He rode in the men's team pursuit at the 2016 UCI Track Cycling World Championships.

Major results
2018
 6th Trofeo Campos, Porreres, Felanitx, Ses Salines
 10th Trofeo Palma
2019
 8th L'Etoile d'Or
2020
 1st Stage 1 Belgrade–Banja Luka
2021
 9th Trofeo Alcudia – Port d'Alcudia
2022
 3rd Prueba Villafranca de Ordizia
 10th Clássica da Arrábida

References

External links
 

1997 births
Living people
Spanish male cyclists
Spanish track cyclists
Sportspeople from Mallorca
Cyclists from the Balearic Islands